Chapinero is the 2nd locality of Bogotá, capital of Colombia. It is located in the north of the city and is one of the more affluent districts of the city. This district is mostly inhabited by upper class residents. The boundaries are Calle 39 in the south, Avenida Caracas in the west, Calle 100 in the north and the Eastern Hills in the east.

The Central Business District (CBD) is located between Calle 72 (traditionally known as the Financial District) in the south and Calle 100 in the north. Chapinero hosts several important leisure, dining and nightlife areas of the city.

History 

Chapinero was part of the thoroughfare connecting Bogotá and the northern part of the country. The area was settled in 1812 by workers in the various industries that provided Bogotá with its day-to-day necessities. The name Chapinero comes from the shoemakers of bespoke shoes for chapines, the local expression for people suffering of pigeon toe syndrome.

Toward the end of the 19th century, the area was further settled with mansions and country estates. As the urbanized city expanded, the area was integrated accordingly. Mule-pulled trams were extended northward in 1875, followed by electric tracks in 1910.

When the Special District of Bogotá was formed in 1955, the area was made into a locality. At that time the El Lago, Chicó, and Cataluña neighborhoods were added into the locality. The physical boundaries remained the same under the reorganization into the Capital District that took place in 1991.

Together with La Candelaria and Teusaquillo, Chapinero is one of the traditional neighborhoods that is distinctive of a particular era in the city's history and urban growth. A historically upper-class neighborhood, the southern part of Chapinero is famous for areas with large Victorian houses reflecting the influence of European architectural styles in Bogotá at the beginning of the 20th century.

Economy and culture 

Chapinero is one of the most important commercial and economic zones of the capital city. Banking and financial centers are headquartered along Calle 72, Carrera 7 and Calle 100 with major shopping areas located along Carreras 11 and 15. Several universities are based in the locality, including the Pontificia Universidad Javeriana, Catholic University of Colombia, Universidad Piloto de Colombia, and the National Pedagogic University.

The zone also includes popular dining areas and nightlife centers, which include the Zona Rosa, the Parque de la 93, and the Zona G; the last one known for its wide offer of upscale restaurants (G stands for Gourmet).

Chapinero is also the center of Bogotá's gay community. There are more than 100 bars, discos and clubs that cater to the gay community in Bogotá, many of which can be found in Chapinero. The biggest and most popular gay disco in Bogotá, Theatron, is located in the heart of Chapinero. Furthermore, the former mayor of Chapinero, Blanca Inés Durán Hernández, is openly lesbian.
The locality has a unique community center focused on the LGBT population of the neighborhood and the city. It is the first of its kind in Latin America.

Government 
Chapinero is among the 20 localities that make up the Capital District of Bogota and thus has its own local administration that is under the jurisdiction of the District's Government secretariat. The current locality mayor is Hernando J. Quintero, appointed by the Mayor of Bogotá, Enrique Peñalosa.

For the 2015 fiscal year it counted with a budget of 26,053,160,000 pesos, about US$8,400,000.

General information

Borders 
 North: Calle 100, bordering the locality of Usaquén
 East: the Eastern Hills, bordering the municipalities of La Calera and Choachí
 South: Calle 39, bordering the locality of Santa Fe
 West: Avenida Caracas and Autopista Norte, with the localities of Barrios Unidos and Teusaquillo

Points of interest 
 Chicó Museum (Museo del Chicó), which includes an old manor house and a surrounding park.
 Our Lady of Lourdes Basilica (Basílica de Nuestra Señora de Lourdes)
 93rd street park (93 Park; Parque de la 93), which is also a hotspot for upscale restaurants, bars and nightclubs.
 Shopping centers:
 Avenida Chile, formerly known as Granahorrar
 Centro Andino
 Atlantis Plaza
 El Retiro
 United Church of Bogotá

Transportation 
Major east-west roads include Calles 39, 45, 53, 57, 63, 85, 92, 94, 100, and Avenida Chile (Calle 72). North-south routes include Carreras 7, 9, 11, 13, 15 and Avenida Caracas.

The locality is served by TransMilenio lines on Avenida Caracas (Carrera 14) and to the west along the Carrera 30. All of the major roads have extensive private bus services.

Neighborhoods 
El Nogal, El Chicó, Antiguo Country, Rosales, Villa del Cerro, Chapinero Central, Chapinero Alto, La Cabrera, El Lago, El Virrey, Quinta Camacho, Pardo Rubio, Marly, La Salle, Bosque Calderón and La Porciúncula.

Before 1955, the term Chapinero included some neighborhoods that are now part of the Teusaquillo locality and did not include the El Lago, Chicó, and Cataluña neighborhoods that are currently part of the locality.

Hydrology 
The rural Eastern Hills today are heavily forested, while until the 1930s were very much deforested. They are crossed by several rivers and creeks, many of which flow through the locality in man-made canals. Among the more important waterways are the Arzobispo River which joins with the San Francisco into the Bogotá River and the Quebrada El Virrey that forms a part of the Salitre river system.

References

External links 

 City of Bogota site 
 Official Secretary of Bogotá site about Chapinero 
 National University of Colombia in the locality 

Localities of Bogotá